Marie-Thérèse Kaiser (born 1996) is a German politician and former model, member of the Alternative for Germany (AfD) party. The Rotenburg action alliance Aufstehen gegen Rassismus (English: Stand Up Against Racism) described her as one of the most important activists of the German Neue Rechte political scene.

Early life and career
As a teenager, Kaiser took part in several beauty pageants in Lower Saxony and at the age of 16 was already a candidate for the Miss Bremen 2013/2014 title. According to her own statements, Kaiser completed a business degree in fashion, luxury and retail management in 2019, during which she also completed foreign language training. She worked as a model for various magazines for several years and appeared on the TV dating show Take Me Out on RTL. Kaiser also worked as an art department employee on several German film productions.

Political career
Until 2015, Kaiser was a member of the Young Union, the youth wing of the CDU/CSU, from which she later left, according to her own statements, out of displeasure with the refugee and migration policy of the Christian Democratic Union (CDU). In autumn 2017 she became a member of Alternative for Germany (AfD) after attending an AfD event organised by Alexander Gauland and Bernd Baumann some time before the 2017 federal election.

Kaiser is chairwoman of the AfD district association in Rotenburg an der Wümme and a member of the board of the AfD state association in Lower Saxony.

From February 2018, she gained greater notoriety through her co-organization of several "Merkel-muss-weg" (English: "Merkel must go") demonstrations in Hamburg, and as the face of a first-time voter campaign by the Young Alternative for the 2020 North Rhine-Westphalia local elections.

In the 2021 federal election, she stood as a direct candidate for the AfD in the constituency of Stade I – Rotenburg II. In the 2021 district election in the district of Rotenburg, the AfD achieved 1.71 percent (down from 2016's 6.6 percent). The only AfD seat in the 55-strong district council was won by Kaiser.

Proximity to the Neue Rechte scene

She also appeared as a guest on the show "Laut Gedacht" on a YouTube channel run by members of the Identitarian movement. In the course of her AfD membership, she attended numerous events organised by Compact Magazine and Götz Kubitschek's Institute for State Policy. In September 2021, she advertised on Twitter the channel of the former Lower Saxony JN state chairman Julian Monaco. Via her Instagram profile, on which she has a total of around 9,000 subscribers as of October 2020, she has networked for protagonists from the right-wing to right-wing extremist scene, including the rappers Prototyp (Kai Naggert) and Chris Ares, as well as the guitarist of the right-wing rock band Stahlgewitter, Frank Kraemer. After Reichsbürger ("Reich Citizens", people who reject the legitimacy of the modern German state) took part in several demonstrations she helped organize, Kaiser stated that she had no problems with citizens who disputed the existence of the German state, stating that as long as they keep their statements to themselves, they are welcome to demonstrate alongside her.

Political views

Kaiser spoke out within the party against the incompatibility list of the AfD, i. e. that former members of the National Democratic Party of Germany, a far-right and Neo-Nazi party, are not allowed to become AfD party members. She also criticized AfD federal spokesman Jörg Meuthen after he spoke out in favor of dissolving Der Flügel.

After the Thuringian AfD chairman Björn Höcke called the Holocaust memorial in Berlin a "monument of shame" in a speech, Kaiser sided with Höcke and protested that the controversy resulting from his choice of words was because he had been misunderstood. She commented on this saying: "I look ahead and deal with topics that are currently on people's hearts. There are enough construction sites, then you don't have to work through the Nazi history again and again."

After former AfD politician Uwe Junge described Manuel Neuer's rainbow captain's armband as a "Schwuchtelbinde" ("faggot armband") during the UEFA Euro 2020, Kaiser condemned Junge's behavior as "damaging the party" and spoke out against homophobia within the AfD. However, she emphasised in relation to this that "[...] [it should be questioned] to what extent homosexuals could represent a traditional family image. [...] The family is under special protection".

References

External links

1996 births
Living people
German female models
Alternative for Germany politicians